Cellular microbiology is a discipline that bridges microbiology and cell biology.

The term "cellular microbiology" was coined by the authors of the book of the same title published in 1996. Cooperation and mutual dependency between microbiology and cell biology had been increasing in the years before that, and the emergence of a new discipline had been suggested and discussed in several scientific conferences.

Cellular microbiology attempts to use pathogenic microorganisms as tools for cell-biology research, and to employ cell-biology methods to understand the pathogenicity of microorganisms. Toxins and virulence factors from microbes have been used for decades to influence processes in eukaryotic cells and to study them. It has increasingly appeared that applying a purified toxin on a cell does not always provide the complete picture, and that understanding the role of the toxin in pathogenicity, the way the toxin promotes the microbe, the way the toxin is produced and the co-evolution of the toxin and its host-cell counterparts, is crucial.

Numerous eukaryotic cellular processes have been clarified using microbial "tools". A major subject in this category is the cytoskeleton. Many microbes modify and influence the synthesis or degradation of the host-cell cytoskeleton, in particular the actin network. Intracellular microbes, such as the bacteria Salmonella and Shigella, elicit actin polymerization in host cells that otherwise do not internalize microbes (non-phagocytes). This causes the formation of projections that eventually engulf the bacteria. Bacteria such as Yersinia inhibit actin polymerization in phagocytes, thereby preventing their uptake. Cellular microbiology tries to understand these processes and how they promote infection. Other eukaryotic processes that microbes influence and that are researched using microbes are signal transduction, metabolism, vesicle trafficking, cell cycle and transcriptional regulation, to name but a few.

Recently, the field of Cellular Microbiology has been expanded to incorporate investigation of the cell biology of microbes themselves. "The field of cellular microbiology is a coalescence of two fields: molecular microbiology and cell biology," said Professor Jacek Hawiger, Chair of Microbiology and Immunology at Vanderbilt University. Particularly in the case of bacterial cells, new technology is starting to be used to reveal a high level of organization within the bacterial cells themselves. For example, high-resolution fluorescence microscopy and atomic force microscopy  are both being used to show just how sophisticated bacterial cells are.

References 

Microbiology
Cell biology